Bradić is a surname found in Serbia and Croatia, derived from brada, . It may refer to:

Biljana Bradić (born 1991), Serbian female football forward
Nebojša Bradić (born 1956), Serbian theater director, and former Minister of Culture in the Government of Serbia

Serbian surnames
Croatian surnames